Greg W. Hinkle is a Republican member of the Montana Legislature. He was elected to Senate District 9, representing Thompson Falls, Montana, in 2009 and 2011. Hinkle served in the Army National Guard from 1966 to 1972. He owns Hinkle's Hardwood Furniture.

References

Living people
1946 births
Republican Party Montana state senators
Politicians from Bellingham, Washington
People from Thompson Falls, Montana